Asparagus fern is a common name given to several plants in the genus Asparagus. It may refer to:

Asparagus aethiopicus
Asparagus densiflorus
Asparagus plumosus
Asparagus setaceus
Asparagus virgatus

fern